The History and Public Policy Program (HAPP) is a program at the Woodrow Wilson Center. It focuses on the relationship between history and policy making and seeks to foster open, informed and non-partisan dialogue on historically relevant issues. The Program is a hub for a wide network of scholars, journalists, policy makers, archivists, and teachers focused on the uses and lessons of history in decision making. Through informed dialogue, the Program seeks to explore the advantages as well as the dangers of using historical lessons in making current policy decisions.

HAPP builds on the pioneering work of the Cold War International History Project in the archives of the former communist world, but seeks to move beyond integrating historical documents into the scholarly discourse. The program focuses on new historical materials which provide fresh, unprecedented insights into the inner workings and foreign policies of the US and foreign powers, laying the groundwork for policymakers to gain a more nuanced and informed understanding of specific countries and regions, as well as issues such as nuclear proliferation, border disputes, and crisis management. By fostering open, informed, and non-partisan dialogue between all sides, HAPP seeks to facilitate a better understanding of the lessons of history.

The Program coordinates advanced research on diplomatic history (through the work of the Cold War International History Project); regional security issues (through its North Korea International Documentation Project); nuclear history (through its Nuclear Proliferation International History Project); and global military and security issues such as its work on the history of the Warsaw Pact and European Security (with European Studies at the Wilson Center).

HAPP's Digital Archive contains once-secret documents from governments all across the globe, uncovering new sources and providing fresh insights into the history of international relations and diplomacy.

The Program operates in partnership with governmental and non-governmental institutions and partners in the US and throughout the world to foster openness, transparency, and dialogue. In cooperation with the American Historical Association's National History Center, HAPP hosts the Washington History Seminar, a weekly in-depth discussion of important new historical research and perspectives in international and national affairs.

References

External links
 
 The Wilson Center's Digital Archive

History organizations based in the United States
Cold War
Nuclear proliferation